William Hamilton (10 May 1884 – 3 April 1939) was a Canadian sports shooter. He competed in two events at the 1920 Summer Olympics.

References

External links
 

1884 births
1939 deaths
Canadian male sport shooters
Olympic shooters of Canada
Shooters at the 1920 Summer Olympics
Sportspeople from Toronto